Duck is an unincorporated community along the border of Braxton and Clay counties in West Virginia, United States. Duck has a post office with ZIP code 25063.

The origin of the name "Duck" is obscure.

References

Unincorporated communities in Clay County, West Virginia
Unincorporated communities in Braxton County, West Virginia
Unincorporated communities in West Virginia